The Alo-daw Pyi Pagoda, also known as the Alodawpyi Pagoda or Alodawpyay Pagoda, is a Buddhist temple in Bagan, Bago Region, Myanmar. Built in the early 12th century, the temple is notable for its old structure and a number of fresco paintings. The temple has been the subject of restorative efforts—funded by donations given by General Khin Nyunt—since 1994, and is a popular pilgrimage site. The temple's name translates to "Wish-fulfilling".

References 

Tourist attractions in Myanmar
Pagodas in Myanmar
Buddhist pilgrimage sites in Myanmar
Buildings and structures in Bago Region
12th-century Buddhist temples